Cara Taylor (born April 23, 2001) is an American fashion model.

Career 
Taylor was discovered via Instagram. She debuted as an Alexander Wang exclusive in 2017. That season she walked in 41 shows for designers including Alberta Ferretti, Balmain, Stella McCartney, Michael Kors, Dolce & Gabbana, Céline, Fendi, Ralph Lauren, Dior, Chanel, Versus (Versace) and Versace. She has appeared in advertisements for Calvin Klein, Salvatore Ferragamo, Hugo Boss, Fendi, Michael Kors, Tom Ford, Prada, Mango, Coach New York, Saint Laurent, Diane von Fürstenberg, Marc Jacobs, and Reebok.

Taylor currently ranks as a "Top 50" model by models.com

References 

Living people
American female models
Female models from Alabama
People from Huntsville, Alabama
2001 births
Next Management models
21st-century American women